This is a list of public holidays (national or otherwise) in Chile; about half of them are Christian holidays.

Dates for the year 2023

History
On January 28, 1915, President of Chile Ramón Barros Luco promulgated law 2,977, which arranged all the information insofar about holidays celebrated in Chile. It established or kept the following holidays:

Sundays year-round.
January 1 (Feast of the Circumcision of Christ at the time; New Year in the late 20th and 21st centuries), June 29 (Saint Peter and Saint Paul), August 15 (Assumption of Mary), December 8 (Immaculate Conception), December 25 (Christmas Day), and the floating holidays of the Ascension of Jesus Christ and Corpus Christi.
Fridays and Saturdays during Holy Week.
September 18, Establishment of the First Government Junta in 1810.
September 19 and May 21, in celebration of the glories of the Army and the Navy.
The day of election of electors of the President of the Republic.

The same law abolished, by omission, four religious holidays: Epiphany ("Adoración de los Santos Reyes", January 6), Carnival ("Carnaval", mobile), Annunciation ("Anunciación del Señor", march 25) and Nativity of the Virgin Mary ("Natividad de la Virgen", September 8). It also shortened the national independence holiday to two days (until 1914, they occupied September 18, 19 and 20).

On November 14, 1921, President Arturo Alessandri Palma promulgated Law 3,810, marking October 12 (Columbus Day) as holiday.

On April 30, 1931, President Carlos Ibáñez del Campo promulgated the "Decree Enforceable as Law" ("Decreto con Fuerza de Ley") 130, marking May 1 (May Day) as holiday.

In 1932, Provisional President Bartolomé Blanche reinstated the September 20 holiday, which existed until 1944.

In 1968, the holidays of Saint Peter and Saint Paul, Ascension of Jesus Christ and Corpus Christi were eliminated by Article 144 of Law 16,840. The Catholic Church agreed to celebrate them on the nearest Sunday.

September 11 (the day of the military coup in 1973) was established as a holiday (Día de la Liberación Nacional, "Day of National Liberation") by the military regime in 1981. In 1998 it was replaced by the Día de la Unidad Nacional ("Day of National Unity"), to be observed the first Monday in September. In March 2002 the latter was abolished.

The holiday on June 29 (Saint Peter and Saint Paul) was reestablished in September 1985.

In 1987, during a visit by Pope John Paul II, Corpus Christi was reestablished (although the Church continued to observe the holiday on the nearest Sunday).

On March 10, 2000, Law 19,668 moved the Saint Peter and Saint Paul, Columbus Day and Corpus Christi holidays to the preceding Monday, if they were to fall on a Tuesday, Wednesday or Thursday, or to the following Monday, if they were to fall on a Friday. Additionally, the designation of Columbus Day was changed from Aniversario del Descubrimiento de América to Día del Descubrimiento de Dos Mundos ("Discovery of Two Worlds' Day"), an obvious corruption from the then-recent ubiquitous "Encuentro de dos mundos" ("The Meeting of Two Worlds") slogan.

On January 6, 2007, Law 20,148 replaced Corpus Christi with Our Lady of Mount Carmel, to be observed July 16, starting that year.

On September 14, 2007, Law 20,215. declared holidays all September 17s falling on a Monday and all September 20s falling on a Friday.

On October 11, 2008, Law 20,299 established Reformation Day on October 31 as a national holiday, starting that year. This holiday is moved to the preceding Friday if it falls on a Tuesday, or to the following Friday if it falls on a Wednesday.

On April 30, 2013, Law 20,663 established the regional Battle of Arica holiday, to be observed only in the Arica and Parinacota region.

On December 30, 2016, Law 20,983 declared as holidays those days that are Monday January 2 or Friday September 17.

On June 19, 2021, Law 21,357 declared the Winter Solstice as a holiday, honoring Chile's aboriginal peoples ("pueblos originarios").

Besides yearly holidays, since 1901 presidential elections are declared holidays, as mandated by successive versions of the General Elections law (Law 18,700 being the current one; see laws 1,464, 1,752, 2,977, decree-law 542, 6,250, 6,834, 9,334 and 12,891). Since the late 20th century, parliamentary and municipal elections are also public holidays (see Law 18,700). Censuses, held every ten years, are also declared holidays since 1982; that year's census and 1992's were so due to ad-hoc laws; censuses taken from 1992 onwards are declared holidays due to a reform in the Census law. (This did not occur in 2012, where the census was carried out in the space of two months, using a different methodology.)

Meaning of the January 1 holiday

Shortly after Chile's independence, an 1824 (government-approved) Church decree reduced the amount of religious holidays, enumerating and the surviving holidays, including the Feast of the Circumcision of Christ, observed on January 1. Law 2,977 (passed in 1915, still in vigour) lists this holiday by date only, without using any name, but does treat it as religious one. However, nowadays (as of 2009) it's widely celebrated as the (civic) New Year holiday. As a matter of fact, there aren't any known regulations later than 1915 that use the "Circumcision of Christ" name, while "New Year" is used by numerous regulations of all types (laws (19.925), decree-laws (decretos ley) (1.299, 1.613 and 2,408), decrees enforceable as law (decretos con fuerza de ley) (D.F.L 338 of 1960), ministerial decrees and resolutions  (decree 6234 of 1929 of the Public Education Ministry (the oldest such regulation), decree 83 of 1985 of the Labor Ministry, decree 48 of 2007 of the Labor Ministry, et cetera) and municipal decrees and ordinances (decree 1316 of 2004 of the Las Condes Municipality, decree 23 of 2006 of the Padre Las Casas Municipality, decree 23 of 2009 of the San Carlos Municipality, et cetera).

Notes

References
Días Feriados en Chile (in Spanish)
Compilation of holiday-related laws (in Spanish)
Fiesta de la Virgen de Carmen (in Spanish)

External links
Chilean calendar with holidays (in Spanish)
Online laws at the Chilean National Congress' Library (in Spanish)

 
Holidays
Chile